is a co-educational private university in Nagata-ku, Kobe, Hyōgo, Japan.

The university was established in 2008 by reorganizing two departments (medical technology and nursing) of Kobe Tokiwa College. In 2012 the Department of Pedagogy (child education) of the college will be merged into the university to constitute the Faculty of Education.

Organization 
The university has no graduate schools yet (as of October 2011).

Undergraduate schools 
 Faculty of Health Sciences
 Department of Medical Technology
 Department of Nursing

Affiliated schools 
 Kobe Tokiwa College (junior college)
 Kobe Tokiwa Girls' High School
 Kindergarten

References

External links 
  

Private universities and colleges in Japan
Universities and colleges in Hyōgo Prefecture